The 2013 AdvoCare 500 was a NASCAR Sprint Cup Series stock car race that was held on September 1, 2013, at Atlanta Motor Speedway in Hampton, Georgia, United States. Contested over 325 laps on the  quad-oval, it was the twenty-fifth race of the 2013 NASCAR Sprint Cup Series season. Kyle Busch of Joe Gibbs Racing won the race, his fourth win of the season, while Joey Logano finished second. Martin Truex Jr., Kurt Busch, and Ryan Newman rounded out the top five.

Report

Background
The track's turns are banked at twenty-four degrees, while the  front stretch, the location of the finish line, and the  back stretch are banked at five. The track's racing surface width varies from 55 feet to 60 feet. Denny Hamlin was the race's defending winner after winning the event in 2012.

Before the race, Jimmie Johnson was leading the Drivers' Championship with 821 points, while Clint Bowyer stood in second with 803 points. Carl Edwards followed in the third with 768, eight points ahead of Kevin Harvick and twenty-nine ahead of Kyle Busch in fourth and fifth. Matt Kenseth, with 730, was in sixth; twenty-two ahead of Dale Earnhardt Jr., who was scored seventh. Eighth-placed Kasey Kahne was three points ahead of Greg Biffle and sixteen ahead of Joey Logano in ninth and tenth. In the Manufacturers' Championship, Chevrolet was leading with 168 points, eleven points ahead of Toyota. Ford was third with 124 points.

Practice and qualifying

Three practice sessions were held before the race. The first session, scheduled on August 30, 2013, was 90 minutes long. The second and third, held a day later on August 31, 2013, were 55 and 50 minutes long.  In the first practice session, Brad Keselowski was the quickest with a best lap time of 29.168 seconds. Edwards followed in second, ahead of Juan Pablo Montoya and Kurt Busch in third and fourth. Bowyer was scored fifth-quickest with a best lap time of 29.491, more than three-tenths slower than Keselowski. Logano, Martin Truex Jr., Mark Martin, Biffle, and Kenseth completed the top-ten.

Edwards, who completed his lap in 29.330 seconds, will start alongside Stenhouse on the grid, in front of Montoya, Hamlin, and Jeff Gordon. Kenseth, with a lap time of 29.492 seconds, was scored sixth  ahead of Truex and Earnhardt in seventh and eighth. Kyle Busch and Johnson completed the first ten grid positions with lap times of 29.570 and 29.572 seconds.

In the first Saturday session, Edwards was quickest with a fastest lap time of 30.224 seconds, six-thousandths of a second faster than Kahne in second. Keselowski managed to be third-quickest with a fastest lap time of 30.290. Bowyer and Kenseth followed in the fourth and fifth positions. Johnson, Kyle Busch, Montoya, Harvick, and Biffle completed the first ten positions. Bowyer followed in second, ahead of Edwards and Montoya in third and fourth. Kahne, who was second-quickest in second practice, managed fifth.

Race

Start
The race went underway at 7:30 p.m. EDT, with Juan Pablo Montoya leading the field to the green flag, A couple of laps later, the first caution came out on lap 25, this was a scheduled competition caution, the race restarted on lap 30 and the second caution came out for a one car wreck in the entrance of pit road by Kasey Kahne, the race restarted on lap 39, with Carl Edwards, the race leader.

Second half
Debris on the track brought out the third caution on lap 58, the race restarted on lap 63 with Jeff Gordon the race leader, A couple of laps later, the fourth caution came out on lap 193 when Clint Bowyer blew an engine, the race restarted on lap 198, The fifth caution came out on lap 206 when Denny Hamlin spun out in the back straightaway, the race restarted on lap 212 with Joey Logano the race leader, the sixth caution came out with 42 laps to go when Jimmie Johnson spun out, the race restarted with 33 laps to go, the seventh caution came out when Brian Vickers caught the grass, with 31 laps to go, the race restarted with 28 laps to go, the eighth caution came out for a two-car wreck involving Jeff Burton and Austin Dillon, the race restarted with 22 laps to go with Martin Truex Jr. the race leader, Kyle Busch won his race at Atlanta.

Results

Qualifying

Standings after the race

Drivers' Championship standings

Manufacturers' Championship standings

Note: Only the first twelve positions are included for the driver standings.

References

AdvoCare 500 (Atlanta)
AdvoCare 500 (Atlanta)
AdvoCare 500 (Atlanta)
NASCAR races at Atlanta Motor Speedway